Frank Francis Sinkwich Sr. (October 10, 1920 – October 22, 1990) was an American football player and coach.  He won the Heisman Trophy in 1942 playing for the University of Georgia, making him the first recipient from the Southeastern Conference. In the course of a brief but celebrated career in professional football, Sinkwich was selected for the National Football League Most Valuable Player Award.  He coached the Erie (PA) Vets semi-professional football team in 1949.  Sinkwich was inducted into the College Football Hall of Fame in 1954.

Early years
Sinkwich was of Croat origin. He was born in Starjak, Croatia (about 12 miles west of Zagreb) as his mother had traveled back to Croatia in 1912. World War I broke out in 1914 and as with many, she and the children remained there for the duration of the war. They returned to the US, going to Youngstown, Ohio when he was two years old, joining his father Ignac (Ignatius) who operated a grocery store. By 1940, the family operated a restaurant in Youngstown. His surname was originally spelled Sinković.

According to an article Sinkwich wrote in 1988, he grew to appreciate the value of competitiveness on the streets of Youngstown's west side. "I learned early in neighborhood pickup games that I had the desire to compete," he wrote. "When people ask why I succeeded in athletics, I always tell them that I didn't want to get beat."

Football career
Sinkwich gained early recognition as a star athlete at Youngstown's Chaney High School. He went on to the University of Georgia to play under coach Wally Butts where he was a two-time All-America selection.  In 1941 he led the nation in rushing yards with 209 carries for 1,103 yards. He set the NCAA single-season total offense record of 2,187 yards and led the Bulldogs to an 11–1 season in 1942, capturing the Southeastern Conference championship and a victory over UCLA in the 1943 Rose Bowl. That same year, the Washington D.C. Touchdown Club honored Sinkwich as "back of the year", and he was overwhelmingly voted the "Number 1 athlete for 1942" in the annual poll by the Associated Press over second-place finisher Ted Williams of the Boston Red Sox, a year in which Williams hit for baseball's triple crown.

The 1942 season was Sinkwich's first year of backfield-mate Charley Trippi. Georgia defeated Florida 75–0, the worst defeat in the history of Florida football. Sinkwich played with a broken jaw and kicked a field goal in a 19–3 defeat of Florida in 1941.

In his three-year college career, Sinkwich rushed for 2,271 yards, passed for 2,331 yards, and accounted for 60 touchdowns (30 rushing and 30 passing). Sinkwich earned his Bachelor of Science in Education (B.S.Ed.) from the university in 1943 and was a member of the Pi Kappa Alpha Fraternity.

After his collegiate career, Sinkwich joined the United States Marine Corps; however, due to his flat feet he received a medical discharge and proceeded to play with the Detroit Lions, who had selected him first overall in the 1943 NFL Draft. In Detroit, he earned All-Pro honors in 1943–1944, as well as being named as NFL MVP in 1944. (No Detroit Lions player would be named NFL MVP for over half a century: Barry Sanders in 1997.)

After his two years in Detroit, Sinkwich served in both the United States Merchant Marines and the United States Army Air Forces, but a knee injury received while playing for the Second Air Force Superbombers football team in 1945 hampered his playing career when he returned to professional football in 1946 and 1947. He coached the semi-professional Erie (PA) Vets football team in 1949. Sinkwich was inducted into the College Football Hall of Fame in 1954.

Legacy

Sinkwich died after a long illness, in Athens, Georgia, at age 70. Nowhere did his death elicit more emotion than at his alma mater. "We've lost one of the great legends in football history," said then Georgia athletic director Vince Dooley. "He was not only a great player but a wonderful person and citizen of Athens."

Head coaching record

See also
 List of NCAA major college football yearly rushing leaders
 List of NCAA major college football yearly total offense leaders

Notes

References

External links
 
 
 

1920 births
1990 deaths
American football halfbacks
Baltimore Colts (1947–1950) players
Detroit Lions players
Georgia Bulldogs football players
Tampa Spartans athletic directors
Tampa Spartans football coaches
New York Yankees (AAFC) players
Second Air Force Superbombers football players
All-American college football players
College Football Hall of Fame inductees
Heisman Trophy winners
National Football League first-overall draft picks
United States Army Air Forces soldiers
United States Army Air Forces personnel of World War II
Coaches of American football from Ohio
Players of American football from Youngstown, Ohio
Croatian emigrants to the United States
Yugoslav emigrants to the United States
United States Marine Corps personnel of World War II
United States Merchant Mariners of World War II
National Football League Most Valuable Player Award winners